MGTOW may refer to:

 Maximum gross takeoff weight, a weight limit for aircraft
 Men Going Their Own Way, an online community